The Jordan Rally is a rallying competition held in Jordan. It was a new addition to the FIA World Rally Championship (WRC) calendar for the 2008 season, and the first occurrence of a WRC event in the Middle East. The rally was previously part of the Middle East Rally Championship (MERC). The 2008 rally was held from 24–27 April with the event headquarters located just outside the capital city of Amman.

Stages
The 2008 Jordan Rally had 21 stages centred on the Dead Sea area (in 40 km radius). The stages all fell within a 75 km area, making it one of the most compact rounds of the season. All stages except one had sections below sea level.

The service area was constructed from scratch, involving the Jordan's Army and Ministry of Housing Public Works. An area of 50 thousand square meters was to be dedicated solely to the purpose of this WRC event, one of the biggest sporting events Jordan has ever held.

Winners

References

External links 

Official Jordan Rally website
WRC Jordan preview
Jordan Rally at eWRC-results

Rally competitions in Jordan
Motorsport competitions in Jordan
Middle East Rally Championship
Recurring sporting events established in 1981
World Rally Championship rallies
Spring (season) events in Jordan
1981 establishments in Jordan